Prozor-Rama is a  municipality located in Herzegovina-Neretva Canton of the Federation of Bosnia and Herzegovina, an entity of Bosnia and Herzegovina. Its seat is Prozor. Also, Ramsko lake is located in the municipality.

History
In the Middle Ages, the King of Hungary held the title of King of Rama named after this region.

Demographics
North Herzegovina

According to the 2013 census, the population of the municipality was 14,280 and of the seat Prozor 3,367.

2013
14,280 total
10,702 Croats (74.94%)
3,525 Bosniaks (24.69%)
3 Serbs (0.02%)
50 others (0.35%)

Settlements
Towns and settlements in the municipality are Blace, Borovnica, Dobroša Donja Vast, Donji Krančići, Donji Višnjani, Družinovići, Duge, Gmići, Gorica, Gornji Krančići, Gornji Višnjani, Gračac, Gračanica, Grevići, Heljdovi, Here, Hudutsko, Ivanci, Jaklići, Klek, Kovačevo Polje, Kozo, Kućani, Kute, Lapsunj, Lizoperci, Ljubunci, Lug, Maglice, Meopotočje, Mluša, Ometala, Orašac, Pajići, Parcani, Paroš, Ploča, Podbor, Proslap, Prozor, Ravnica, Ripci, Rumboci, Šćipe, Šćit, Šerovina, Skrobućani, Šlimac, Tošćanica, Trišćani, Ustirama, Uzdol, Varvara and Zahum.

Sports
The area is home to the football club HNK Rama, and basketball club HKK Rama.

Notable people 
Diva Grabovčeva

References

External links

Official website of municipality Prozor - Rama
Ramski Vjesnik - local news portal
rama-prozor.info
prozor-x.com

 
Populated places in Prozor-Rama